David Tomić (born 9 February 1998) is a German footballer who plays as a midfielder for SGV Freiberg.

Career
In the summer of 2020, Tomić moved to MSV Duisburg. He made his professional debut for MSV Duisburg in the 3. Liga on 19 September 2020, in the away match against Hansa Rostock. He left Duisburg at the end of the 2020–21 season. In September 2021, he joined Sonnenhof Großaspach.

Career statistics

References

External links

1998 births
Living people
German people of Serbian descent
Footballers from Hesse
German footballers
Association football midfielders
1. FC Kaiserslautern II players
VfB Stuttgart II players
MSV Duisburg players
SG Sonnenhof Großaspach players
SGV Freiberg players
3. Liga players
Regionalliga players
Oberliga (football) players
Sportspeople from Hanau